Matysiak is a Polish surname.

Notable people with this surname include:
 Andrzej Matysiak (born 1948)，Polish canoer
 Bartłomiej Matysiak (born 1984)，Polish cyclist
 Paulina Matysiak (born 1984), Polish politician

Matysiak family, Polish Matysiakowie is a Polish radio drama, since 1956.

Polish-language surnames